Owl and Key is a student organization at the University of Utah that is a cross between a class club and an honor society. Organized in 1910, its membership was traditionally restricted to senior men. However, women are now represented among the society's members. Membership is by invitation only. Invitations are generally extended as a recognition for scholastic achievement and leadership and service in the community.  Invitations are limited to 15 initiates per year. Members are recognized during commencement exercises.

Notable members of Owl and Key include Bob Bennett, Hugh W. Pinnock, John Thomas Greene, Jr. and Russell M. Nelson.

References

1910 establishments in Utah
Honor societies
Student societies in the United States
University of Utah
Student organizations established in 1910